JDC–Miller MotorSports is a sports car racing team that currently competes in the IMSA WeatherTech SportsCar Championship. The team currently fields the No. 5 Mustang Sampling Cadillac DPi-V.R full-time for Tristan Vautier and Richard Westbrook in the Daytona Prototype International class of the WeatherTech SportsCar Championship. Additionally, JDC runs the No. 17 Unitronic/Liqui Moly Audi RS3 LMS TCR SEQ full-time for Chris Miller and Zikey Taylor in the Touring Car class.

History

The team was founded in 1994 by John Church and Gerry Kraut. The first major trophy was winning the 2007 Star Mazda Championship with American driver Dane Cameron. The performance was not repeated in 2008, when the American racing driver Joel Miller finished the season only on the 2nd place. JDC MotorSports won its second drivers' title in the 2009 season, when British racing driver Adam Christodoulou won the championship. Also in 2009, JDC MotorSports won the championship in the F2000 Championship Series through American racing driver Chris Miller. In 2011, Frenchman Tristan Vautier won the Star Mazda Championship, receiving a scholarship that later allowed him to advance in 2012 Indy Lights, in the Road to Indy program. The 2012 season brings another runner-up title in this competition through Colombian racing driver Gabby Chaves.

In 2014, the JDC-Miller MotorSports made its debut in the new competition, United SportsCar Championship, which resulted from the merger of Rolex Sports Car Series and American Le Mans Series. At the first participation in this competition, the best result was the 3rd place in the race from Road America to the Prototype Challenge class. The main race drivers this season were Chris Miller and Stephen Simpson. In the 2015 season, the team finished three times on the podium, in the race at The Raceway on Belle Isle they finished in 2nd place, and in the 24-hour races at Daytona and Canadian Tire Motorsport Park they finished in 3rd place. Races were Mikhail Goikhberg, Chris Miller, Rusty Mitchell and Stephen Simpson. In the third season of this competition, with the name change in the WeatherTech SportsCar Championship, the JDC-Miller MotorSports achieves its first major victories, winning the 24-hour race at Daytona and Long Beach Street Circuit, finishing at the end of the season in position third in the general classification with pilots Mikhail Goikhberg and Stephen Simpson in the 2016 Prototype Challenge class.

In the 2017 season, the team moved to the Prototype class, Mikhail Goikhberg and Stephen Simpson finished 2nd in Watkins Glen International and Canadian Tire Motorsport Park, finishing 4th overall. The 2018 season brings another premiere within the team, being the first time they line up two cars at the start. In the no 85 car, the full season racing drivers were the American Robert Alon and the Swiss Simon Trummer, and in the no. 99 car were Mikhail Goikhberg and Stephen Simpson, the latter bringing the only victory of the season and the first in the Prototype class in round of the Watkins Glen International. 2019 was the most modest season for the team. Stephen Simpson and Simon Trummer in car number 84 and Mikhail Goikhberg and Tristan Vautier in car number 85 only had points in the 10 rounds of the season.

Racing results

WeatherTech SportsCar Championship

Michelin Pilot Challenge

WeatherTech SportsCar Championship wins

Overall wins

Class wins

References

External links 
 Official website

American auto racing teams
WeatherTech SportsCar Championship teams
Auto racing teams established in 1994